This is a list of all television sitcom episodes Living Single.

Series overview

Episodes

Season 1 (1993–94)

Season 2 (1994–95)

Season 3 (1995–96)

Season 4 (1996–97)

Season 5 (1997–98)

References

External links

 Lists of American sitcom episodes